Dobrosav Milojević was born in Donje Štiplje near Jagodina in 1948. He is well known living Serbian artist among the naïve painters. He lives and works in Donje Štiplje.

Biography 
The official start of his dealing with the naive art is since 1971, when he was admitted to the Museum of Naïve and Marginal Art in Jagodina. Since then, he is its constant member. In the last 40 years, he had a huge number of solo exhibitions in Serbia and around the world. He has a permanent exhibition of paintings in the Museum of Naive Art in Jagodina and his paintings can be seen in many galleries around the world: Museum of Naïve and Marginal Art, Gallery of Self-taught Artists in Trebnje, the Galleries in Sanski Most, Gallery of International Naïve Art (GINA) in Tel Aviv, Gallery of Naive Art in Kovačica,  Gallery of Primitive and Folk Art, San Francisco. He has won several awards and plaques for his work.

Art
He was interested in painting since early boyhood. As a child of the village he found inspiration in motifs that are related to village and life in it. While he lived in the city he felt strong nostalgie for the village and happy childhood days. This resulted in many of vividly pictures that depicted a beautiful landscape of mountains around the Crni Vrh (Jagodina), the mountain that marked his life and which he finally returned. Among the many affirmative opinions about his painting, the most important are:
 former President of the Serbian Academy of Sciences and Arts Dr. Dejan Medaković´s opinion (from the Dobrosav Milojević's Catalogue, Museum of Naïve Art, Jagodina, 1997), 
 and Member of Department of Language and Literature of Serbian Academy of Sciences and Arts  Dr. Vojislav J. Đurić's opinion (from speech at the opening of exhibition in Jagodina, 8 December 1993).

Sample works

Publications

Monographs

Bibliography 
 "World Encyclopedia of Naïve Art", Oto Bihalji-Merin, 1984, Belgrade,   Yugoslavia
 "Yugoslavian Naïve Painters", 1991, Belgrade
 "Dobrosav Milojevic", K. Smiljkovic, 1993,
 ˝Dobrosav Milojevic Biography˝ - Gallery of International Naïve Art (GINA)
 "Naïve Art in Serbia", Jagodina, Yugoslavia
 "Naïve Art in Australia, Canada and Europe", Vasa Carapic, 1994, Melbourne
 "The Key to Making Dreams Come True", Koviljka Smiljkovic, 1999, Novi Sad
 "Fiction", Museum of Naïve and Marginal Art in Jagodina, 2003,
 "13th Biennial", Nina Krstic, Museum of Naïve and Marginal Art in Jagodina, Serbia,  2007.

Some of Exhibitions 
1973 Gallery of the Foreign Affairs Ministry Club, Belgrade
1974 Protocol Salon if the Ministry of Foreign Affairs
1974 Caldarese Gallery, Bologna, Italy
1974 International Book Fair, Brussels
1977 Gallery of the Foreign Affairs Ministry Club, Belgrade
1979 Arvil Gallery, Mexico
1980 Gallery of Primitive and Folk Art, San Francisco
1981 Motovun Publishers Group, Motovun
1982 Yugoslav Embassy, Prague
1986 Djura Jaksic's House, Skadarlija Gallery, Belgrade
1988 "3D", Janko Lisjak Gallery, Belgrade
1990 Casino Grand Cercle, Aix-Les-Bains
1991 Lionel Wendt Gallery, Sri Lanka
1991 Speranza Gallery, Belgrade
1993 Museum of Naïve and Marginal Art in Jagodina
1994 Konak Knjeginje Ljubice Museum, Belgrade
1994 Gallery of Naive Art in Kovačica,
1994 Plaza Hotel, Herceg Novi
1997 "Solo Exhibition", City Library, Belgrade
2000 "Solo Exhibition of paintings", Amien
2003 "Dobrosav Milojevic", Galerie de l'Espace Delvaux, Bruxelles
2008 "Guido Vedovato, Dobrosav Milojević", Instituto Italiano di Cultura, Belgrado
2010 "40 years of artistic creation, Exhibition of paintings",Gallery of Naive Art in Kovačica,

Notes

References 
Museum of Naïve and Marginal Art in Jagodina
Monography, Dobrosav Milojević, Publisher: Museum of Naïve and Marginal Art, Jagodina, Serbia 2010.
Dobrosav Milojević, Catalogue, Publisher: Museum of Naïve and Marginal Art, Jagodina, Serbia 1997.
˝Dobrosav Milojevic Biography˝ - Gallery of International Naïve Art (GINA)
˝Ogledalo vizuelne umetnosti˝ - Izdavaštvo, Monografije, Dobrosav Milojević

External links
Dobrosav Milojevic’s official website

1948 births
Living people
Naïve painters
Serbian painters